Vishwajyot High School, also known as 'VJHS', is a private Co-ed school in Kharghar, Navi Mumbai, Maharashtra, India.

History 
Vishwajyot High School is part of the Shevantabai & Shankarrao Dhumal Foundation. The school was founded in 2004 with kindergarten classes only. Gradually, more classes were introduced. At present the school has classes from Kindergarten to Class 12. The school's philosophy is " To make students independent learner by teaching them how to earn".

School Logo 
The school logo is a torch and a nib. The nib is a symbol of education and the torch denotes that VJHS students will illumine the world with their wisdom and creativity.

Academics 
The school is affiliated to the Council for the Indian School Certificate Examinations (CICSE). It is a co-educational day school with around 1700 students located opposite Central Park Kharghar Sector-20.

Vishwajyot High School encourages the students to take part in various co-curricular activities held in school such as music, dance, arts and sports. The campus of Vishwajyot High School is equipped with infrastructural facilities such as class rooms with teaching aids, library, computer labs, science labs and playground.
	
It was built to address the problems in the Indian education system by espousing:
 Virtual One on One Coaching.
 English Communication Skills.
 Integrated Learning.
 Experiential Learning.

School Goals

To make students integrated individuals so that they will be better equipped to:
 	
 Analyse real-life situation and arrive at conclusion.
 Handle any situation in life effectively.
 Speak eloquently.
 Be self-confident and creative.
 Be aware of the environment & its conservation.
 be good global citizen, while rooted in Indian culture.

VHS is often in news for their unique teaching method and academic achievements.

Vishwajyot International School was set up in Phaltan to provide the same learning opportunities to children of Phaltan and nearby villages as any big city children get. Since its inception, it has enabled students to “discover the extraordinary” in academics, sports, and extracurricular activities.
Walking into a classroom in Phaltan, one could be anywhere in the world. All conversations happen in English, including each student waving enthusiastically in the air when the teacher poses a question. Classroom walls are covered with student work and inspiring facts. It's truly a joy to see children bubbling over with love for learning. And our little children in remote Phaltan have plenty of it!

Spreading our wings to other parts of Maharashtra, Vishwajyot International School was set up in Lonand in 2014. Vishwajyot International Lonand boasts of 100% of students conversing in English and giving many students opportunities at the District and National levels across different sporting activities.
Welcoming its first batch of Eight Graders in 20-21 in a newly created state-of-the-art campus, located at Lonand- Nira Highway, in Satara District, Maharashtra, Vishwajyot International Lonand has always been associated with enabling children to discover the extraordinary within them and around the world, through personalised and project-based learning.

ICSE results

2012 -

Pictures

References 

2004 establishments in Maharashtra
Educational institutions established in 2004
High schools and secondary schools in Maharashtra
Private schools in Maharashtra
Education in Raigad district